Mercier is a Champagne producer based in the Épernay region of Champagne. Parts of the cellar are open to the public, where visitors can use rail carts to navigate the tunnels. Today, the house owns  of vinyards. Mercier owned the original rights to the name Dom Pérignon but gave the brand to Moët et Chandon in 1927. Today the house is under the umbrella of the LVMH group and is the number one selling brand of Champagne in the domestic French market.

See also
 List of Champagne houses
 :simple:Eugène Mercier

Further reading

EUGENE MERCIER : UN ENTREPRENEUR - Archives municipales d’Epernay]

References

External links
Eugene Mercier, The Communication Genius
Champagne Mercier Champagne Mercier
Eugene Mercier Epernay

Mercier
Companies established in 1858
1858 establishments in France
French brands
LVMH brands